Abu Muhammad al-Maqdisi, or more fully Abu Muhammad Essam al-Maqdisi, is the assumed name of Essam Muhammad Tahir al-Barqawi, an Islamist Jordanian-Palestinian writer. A Qutubi jihadi ideologue, he has popularized many of the most common themes of radical Islam today, like the theological impetus given to the notion of Al Wala' Wal Bara', being the first to declare the Saudi royal family to be apostates or considering democracy a religion, and thus whoever believes in it to be an apostate, but he is best known as the spiritual mentor of Jordanian jihadist Abu Musab al-Zarqawi, the initial leader of al-Qaeda in Iraq. However, an ideological and methodical split emerged between Maqdisi and Zarqawi in 2004 due to Zarqawi's takfeer proclamations towards the Shia populations in Iraq. Maqdisi opted for a more cautious approach towards targeted Shia killings, attempting to stop Zarqawi's radical ideological movement before Zarqawi's methods become counter-productive.

The writings of Maqdisi still have a wide following; a study carried out by the Combating Terrorism Center of the United States Military Academy (USMA) concluded that Maqdisi "is the most influential living Jihadi Theorist" and that "by all measures, Maqdisi is the key contemporary ideologue in the Jihadi intellectual universe". The Tawhed jihadist website, which he owns, continues to operate; the USMA report describes it as "al-Qa`ida's main online library".

Background
Maqdisi was born in 1959 in the city of Nablus, West Bank. At a young age his family immigrated to Kuwait. He later studied at the University of Mosul in Iraq. It was during this time he began to take on an Islamist world view.

He began to travel around Kuwait and Saudi Arabia in order to visit with numerous religious students and sheikhs. However he came to believe that many of these religious figures were ignorant of the true state of affairs in the Muslim world. He then began to study the writings of Sayyid Qutb and Hassan al-Banna and the methods of the Muslim Brotherhood.

Maqdisi travelled to Pakistan and Afghanistan and met many of the Afghan jihad groups there at the time. In Pakistan he was based in the city of Peshawar, a center for the Afghan Jihad, remaining there for three years as a professor of religion, where he first met the later notorious Jordanian jihadist Abu Musab al-Zarqawi, and also where he published some of his most famous books : Millat Ibrahim, considered to be his single most influential work, and Al-Kawashif al-Jaliyya fi Kufr al-Dawla al-Sa'udiyya, where he declared the Saudi state to be infidels. He also confronted the members of Takfir wal-Hijra and wrote a book refuting their extreme views. In 1992, he returned to Jordan. He began to denounce the Jordanian government and what he believed were the man-made laws being implemented there. He was also the first prominent Islamist scholar to brand the House of Saud as unbelievers or takfir, and to hold the adoption of democracy as tantamount to apostasy. His teachings gained many adherents and this earned him the attention of the Jordanian government, and he was arrested and imprisoned. During the years 1995–99 both he and al-Zarqawi were in prison together and he exerted a strong influence on al-Zarqawi, shaping his Islamist ideology. Their strategic plans were described by Fouad Hussein in his book Al-Zarqawi: The Second Generation of Al Qaeda.

After they were released from prison, al-Zarqawi departed for Afghanistan while Maqdisi stayed in Jordan. He was later rearrested on terrorism charges for conspiring to attack American targets in Jordan. He was released again in July 2005, but arrested again after he gave an interview to al Jazeera. In 2009 he defended himself against "younger extremists accus[ing] him of going soft" by quoting the American Combating Terrorism Center at West Point, which identified him "as a dangerous and influential jihadi theorist."

Maqdisi served a five-year term in a Jordanian prison for allegations of jeopardising state security and recruiting jihadists to fight in Afghanistan. He was released in June 2014 by the Jordanian government, in a move speculated to be motivated by their opposition to the Islamic State of Iraq and the Levant. On 21 September 2014, he advocated for the release of British hostage, Alan Henning. Al-Maqdisi said, "Henning worked with a charitable organization led by Muslims which sent several aid convoys to help the Syrian people. Is it reasonable that his reward is being kidnapped and slaughtered? ... He should be rewarded with thanks. ..We call on the (Islamic) State to release this man (Henning) and other aid group employees who enter the land of Muslims with a guarantee of protection ... according to the judgment of Shariah law," he said."

Maqdisi has also told those thinking of fighting for the Yemeni government against the Shia insurgency of the Houthis, that they should instead keep well out of the war against the Houthis because Yemeni's must not help Yemen's pro-Western government, which deserves to be overthrown.

Jihadi relationships
Dr. Abdullah al-Muheisini, a Saudi expat and religious scholar who abandoned his life of wealth and privilege in Saudi Arabia to struggle side by side with the mujahideen in Syria,  endorsed Islamic scholars like Al-Balawi, Eyad Quneibi, Tareq Abdulhalim, Hani al-Siba'i, Yusuf al-Ahmed, Abdulaziz al-Tureifi, Suleiman al-Ulwan, Abu Qatada al-Filistini, and Abu Muhammad al-Maqdisi.

Doğu Türkistan Bülteni Haber Ajansı reported that the Turkistan Islamic Party was praised by Abu Qatada along with Abdul Razzaq al Mahdi, Maqdisi, Muhaysini and Ayman al-Zawahiri.

Abu Muhammad al-Maqdisi and Abu Qatada were referenced by Muhaysini.

Upon the death of Omar Abdel-Rahman, condolences were given by al-Maqdisi.

Tariq Abdelhaleem complained about Hayyat Tahrir al-Sham being criticized by Barqawi. Tariq criticized on a statement on Hayyat by Barqawi. Tariq posted a tweet defending Abu Jaber against Barqawi. Nusra was criticized by Maqdisi. An HTS spokesman was slammed by Al-Maqdisi Barqawi was criticized by Tariq.

Euphrates Shield was attacked and criticized by al-Maqdisi.

Works
 This is our Aqeedah
 Millat Ibrahim
 Democracy is a Religion
 The Obvious Proofs of the Saudi State's Disbelief
 ...So, Do Not Fear Them!
 Expecting the Best from Allah
 Delighting The Sight by Exposing the Doubts of Contemporary Murjiah
 Meezaanul-I'itidaal  li-taqyim kitaab ul-Mawrid al-Zilaal fi-Tanbeeh ala' Akthaa al-Dhilaal

See also
Abu Qatada
Abu Basir al-Tartusi
Abu Musab al-Suri
Muhammad Surur
 Abu Qutaibah al Majali

References

Further reading

External links
 Official website (in Arabic)
 Al-Jazeera interview, July 2005
 CTC Militant Ideology Atlas, compendium
 http://jihadology.net/category/individuals/ideologues/abu-mu%e1%b8%a5mmad-al-maqdisi/

1959 births
Living people
Palestinian Islamists
Palestinian Sunni Muslim scholars of Islam
People from Nablus
Palestinian people imprisoned abroad
Prisoners and detainees of Jordan
Palestinian political writers
Jordanian Salafis
Critics of Shia Islam
Qutbism
Jordanian Qutbists
Qutbists
Salafi jihadists
University of Mosul alumni